Dithakong is the name of a place east of Kuruman in the Northern Cape, South Africa, which had been a major destination for several of the earliest nineteenth century expeditions from the Cape to the interior of the subcontinent. In colonial literature the name is often rendered in such ways as Litakun, also Litakoo or Lattakoo.

The nineteenth century Tswana town
At the time of the 1801 Truter-Somerville Expedition Dithakong was an important BaTlhaping (BaTswana) capital under Kgosi ('Chief') Molehebangwe. Significant accounts of this first expedition were left by, amongst others, William Somerville and John Barrow, with well-known watercolour illustrations by Samuel Daniell. Kgosi Mothibi, son of Molehebangwe, had succeeded as leader of the BaTlhaping by the time that William Burchell visited there in 1811. 

The early traveller accounts refer to an impressively large town consisting of mud houses, traces of which have yet to be located archaeologically. 

The Battle of Dithakong in 1823 was part of the conflict and upheavals ending a period of strife referred to in the interior as the Difaqane, and is subject to debate following Cobbing's critique of once orthodox views of the Mfecane as a period of conflict generated by Zulu expansion.

The Battle of Dithakong

The battle of Dithakong was fought between Manthatisi hordes and Batlhaping with the help of the Griqua. The epic battle that took almost seven hours was recorded by Robert Moffat on 23 June 1823 where the BaThlaping found themselves threatened by thousands of Batlokwa/Basotho of Mmanthatisi – the Phuting and the Hlakwana. The tribes fought each other for dwindling supplies of cattle and corn. They were armed, hungry and intent on raiding the BaThlaping’s cattle. This conflagration was rolling westwards – in the direction of Kuruman.
Reverend Moffat rushed from Kuruman to Griquatown to persuade the Griqua to assist the BaThlaping. Reverend Waterboer in Griquatown, assisted by other Griqua leaders (Barend Barends from Danielskuil and Adam Kok II from Campbell) rode northwards with about 200 men. They were accompanied by BaTlhaping warriors.

About 200 Griqua horsemen, armed with guns, faced the massed ranks of the Basotho armed with spears and cowhide shields. The BaTlhaping age regiments were held in reserve as the Griqua launched their attack.

The Basotho suffered terrible casualties were forced to flee, a devastating and a first loss for Mmantahtisi after obliberating almost 29 tribes since leaving Harrismith at the start of Difaqane! 

Dithakong was later subjected to bombardment by colonial forces (under Charles Warren) suppressing a Tswana uprising in 1878.

The earlier stone walled settlement
On adjacent hills are stone walled ruins, also referred to as Dithakong (in fact the name means 'place of ruins'), about which Somerville enquired in 1801. The BaTlhaping claimed not to have known who had made or lived in this earlier town.  Archaeological investigations have established Tswana affinities in this earlier settlement (itself showing more than one episode of development) which includes features indicative of frontier complexity at this south-western edge of Tswana expansion.

Modern Dithakong
Dithakong today is a local centre in the Joe Morolong (formerly Moshaweng) Municipality of the John Taola Gaetsewe District Municipality.

Dithakong is the birthplace of Matthews Batswadi, the first black South African athlete to be awarded national sporting colours, known as Springbok Colours, after the institutionalisation of Apartheid by the Nationalist Party government following its election victory in 1948.  Batswadi was born in the village in 1949 and has lived there ever since retiring from work at the Beatrix Gold Mine in the Free State and from active competition in 1986. He was awarded Springbok Colours in 1977 after racial discrimination was removed from the constitution of the then controlling body, the South African Amateur Athletics Union, thereby allowing blacks to receive national sporting colours.

References

External links
 

Populated places in the Joe Morolong Local Municipality